Rob Mason (born June 8, 1976) was an American politician serving as a member of the Idaho House of Representatives from the 16th district from 2018-2020. Mason is a member of the Democratic Party and is an environmentalist.

Early life and education
Rob Mason was born on June 8, 1976 in Elizabethtown, Pennsylvania. He went to college at Georgia Tech, where he became an environmentalist and graduated with a bachelor's degree in environmental biology.

Early career
Mason was a member of the U.S. Forest Service for seven years from 2001 to 2008. After leaving the U.S Forest Service, Mason was the head of Selway-Bitterroot Frank Church Foundation for five years, from 2008 to 2013. Mason is currently the Central Idaho Representative for the Wilderness Society, a job he has held since 2013.

Idaho House of Representatives

Committees
During his term, Mason has served on the following Committees.
Environment, Energy, and Technology Committee
Resources and Conservation Committee
Revenue and Taxation Committee

Elections

2018 
Mason defeated Colin Nash, Barb Vanderpool, George Tway, and Geoff Stephenson in the Democratic primary with 35.4% of the vote. Mason defeated Republican nominee Jim Silsby with 62.6% of the vote.

References 

Living people
1976 births
21st-century American politicians
Members of the Idaho House of Representatives
Georgia Tech alumni